PeoplesBank is the largest community bank in Western Massachusetts, providing banking and other financial services.  As of 2020 it had $3.3 billion in assets.

History

PeoplesBank is a branch bank incorporated on March 19, 1885 as Peoples Savings Bank. Its first president was William Skinner of William Skinner and Sons Silk, who would serve as the bank's president from its founding until 1901, a year before his passing. A number of prominent figures in Holyoke's founding would work for the bank, including architect George P. B. Alderman, who sat on its board, and Judge John Hildreth, as a clerk, whose Oakdale estate, the Yankee Pedlar, was reopened as a branch of the bank in 2019. It was first headquartered in Downtown Holyoke, Massachusetts with an additional office in Springfield, Massachusetts. In 1974, the bank would expand its headquarters with a large Brutalist commercial block at the corners of High and Suffolk Streets as part of a city revitalization campaign, where it maintains a branch today.

By October 2003, it formally changed its name to PeoplesBank, and operates as a subsidiary of PeoplesBancorp, MHC (Holyoke, MA), out of headquarters by the Holyoke Mall at 330 Whitney Avenue, formerly the offices of Community Savings Bank.

References

1885 establishments in Massachusetts
Banks based in Massachusetts
Banks established in 1885
Companies based in Holyoke, Massachusetts